Bertini may refer to:

People 

Adriana Bertini, Brazilian fashion designer
Alba de Céspedes y Bertini (1911–1997), Cuban-Italian writer
Catherine Bertini (born 1950), American public servant
Demostene Bertini or Démosthenes Magalhães, Brazilian football player
Eugenio Bertini (1846–1933), Italian mathematician
Francesca Bertini (1892–1985), Italian silent film actress
Gary Bertini (1927–2005), Israeli conductor
Franco Bertini (born 1938), Italian basketball player
Giovanni Bertini (1951–2019), Italian football player
Giuseppe Bertini (1825–1898), Italian painter
Henri Bertini (1798–1876), French composer and pianist
Ivano Bertini (born 1968), Italian astronomer
Lisa Bertini (born 1972), Italian rower
Lorenzo Bertini (rower) (born 1976), Italian rower
Mario Bertini (born 1944), Italian football player
Romeo Bertini (1893–1973), Italian athlete
Sabrina Bertini (born 1969), Italian volleyball player
Silvano Bertini (1940–2021), Italian boxer

Other 
Mantidactylus bertini, a species of frog in the family Mantellidae
Ulmus 'Pyramidalis Bertini', an elm cultivar
Theorem of Bertini, an existence and genericity theorem